Bourne Wood (also known as Bourne Woods) is an area of predominantly coniferous woodland just south of Farnham, Surrey, England and a film location, under 10 minutes from the famous film location of Hankley Common in Elstead. Locally it was known as the Clumps, and was called this until Forestry England changed the name in the 1950s when fire breaks were introduced, Charles Darwin may have written about the area in Appendices of Natural Selection-describing the trees in clumps. A promontory (rise) above a large heathland clearing (made for the filming of Gladiator) provides views over the surrounding woodland. Much of the wood was formerly heathland at the western end of the Greensand Ridge that was developed privately during the 20th century as commercial conifer plantations. This part of the wood has been purchased by the Royal Society for the Protection of Birds and is being restored mainly to heath, with retention of some woodland of wildlife significance, as Farnham Heath nature reserve. Their aim is to benefit scarce heathland species such as nightjar, woodlark, Dartford warbler and tree pipit as well as species such as sand lizard.

Location for Filming 

Since 1999, part of Bourne Wood has been frequently used as a location for filming movies, television series and music videos, most notably the opening battle scenes of the film Gladiator which helped the location to gain popularity. In addition, television adverts for products such as Marmite and IKEA have been filmed at the woods.

In September 2012 Forestry England announced plans to allow filming to take place in the Bourne Wood for up to eight months a year, noting that the site was a "nationally strategic film industry resource".  In October 2013 Waverley Borough Council planning committee granted permission for filming to be allowed at Bourne Wood for up to six months in one year or eight months over two years, with night filming for no more than seven days a year.  Use of helicopters during filming will require additional permission from the council.  Temporary structures may not exceed 25 m in height.  The decision will be reviewed after five years.

In chronological order, the following productions have included scenes filmed in the Bourne Wood. All films are feature films unless otherwise stated.

Wartime
During the Second World War a searchlight post was established in the woodland, the concrete base of which is marked and still visible today. Three structures were erected by Canadian soldiers in the northernmost section of the woods bordering Dene Lane, consisting of a mess hut and barracks for those manning the searchlight. Two of these buildings became separate dwellings owned by Forestry England providing accommodation for employees before becoming private houses.

Other
Much of the wood was formerly heathland at the western end of the Greensand Ridge that was developed privately during the 20th century as commercial conifer plantations.

The headwaters of the Wey (west branch) converging on the town to the north are locally known also as The Bourne, which accordingly has helped to name Lower Bourne, a ward and neighbourhood of Farnham.

Two round tumuli are east and south-east of Forest Cottage in the wood.  They are late Bronze Age, 21m and 26m in diameter and 1.7m and 2m high and one has suffered some disturbance in the centre and the south-eastern quadrant. Surrounding the mound is a ditch from which material was quarried during the construction of the monument. This is no longer visible at ground level, having become infilled over the years, and can be seen in a geophysical survey as a buried feature about 3m wide.

References

Forests and woodlands of Surrey
Protected areas of Surrey
Farnham